Somewhere in Europe may refer to:

Somewhere in Europe (film), Hungarian film
Somewhere in Europe (song), song by Liam Reilly